What's Left of Me is the second solo album by American singer-songwriter Nick Lachey, released on May 9, 2006, by Jive Records and Zomba. The album includes the hit ballad "What's Left of Me", which to date is Lachey's most successful single as a solo artist. Other singles included are titled "I Can't Hate You Anymore" and "Resolution". On June 14, 2006, What's Left of Me was certified Gold by the Recording Industry Association of America for shipments of over 500,000 copies and has sold 441,982 to date, making it the first Lachey solo album to be certified by the RIAA. Lachey embarked on the What's Left of Me Tour in support of the album.

Track listing

Additional tracks
"Did I Ever Tell You" (Nick Lachey, Adam Anders, Pamela Sheyne) (US Target stores bonus track) – 3:53
"Alone" (UK and Japanese bonus track) – 3:28
"Because I Told You So" (Jonatha Brooke) (Japanese bonus track) – 3:45
"Don't Shut Me Out" (Nick Lachey, Adam Anders, Pamela Sheyne) – 3:37

Personnel
Credits adapted from the album's liner notes.

Vocals
 Emanuel Kiriakou – background vocals 
 Xandy Barry – background vocals 
 Dan Muckala – background vocals 
 Luke Brown – background vocals 
 Nick Lachey – background vocals 

Instrumentation
 Emanuel Kiriakou – bass, acoustic guitar, electric guitar, piano, keyboards 
 Greg Johnston – bass, electric guitar 
 Wally Gagel – bass, guitar 
 Sebastian Nylund – bass , guitar 
 Greg Wells – bass, drums 
 Adam Lester – guitar 
 Corky James – guitar 
 David Martin – acoustic guitar 
 Chuck Butler – acoustic guitar, electric guitar 
 Jess Cates – piano 
 Peter Ljung – piano 
 Jamie Cullum – piano 
 Rob Wells – piano 
 Dan Muckala – piano, keyboards 
 Dan Needham – drums 
 Joey Waronker – drums, percussion 
 Jimi Englund – percussion 

Technical
 Chris Lord-Alge – mixing
 Dim'e Krnjaic – assistant mix engineer
 Keith Armstrong – assistant mix engineer
 Tom Coyne – mastering

Artwork
 Olaf Heine – photography
 Jackie Murphy – art direction, design
 Sean Kinney – art direction, design
 Samantha McMillen – stylist
 Diana Schmidtke – groomer

Charts

Weekly charts

Year-end charts

Certifications

References

2006 albums
Nick Lachey albums
Jive Records albums
Albums produced by Emanuel Kiriakou
Albums produced by Greg Wells
Albums recorded at Westlake Recording Studios